Sir Robert Reynolds Macintosh (17 October 1897, Timaru, New Zealand – 28 August 1989, Oxford, England) was a New Zealand-born British anaesthetist. He was the first professor of anaesthetics outside the United States.

Early life
Macintosh was baptised with the Maori name Rewi Rawhiti. He was the youngest son of Charles Nicholson Macintosh, newspaper editor and mayor of Timaru in 1901, and his wife, Lydia Beatrice Thompson. He spent part of his childhood in Argentina, but returned to New Zealand when he was thirteen years old. He was educated at Waitaki Boys' High School, where he was head of school and excelled academically and athletically.

In December 1915, he travelled to Britain and was commissioned in the Royal Scots Fusiliers, soon transferring to the Royal Flying Corps. He was shot down behind enemy lines on 26 May 1917 and taken prisoner, escaping several times.

Medical

After the war, Macintosh trained at Guys Hospital Medical School, qualifying MRCS LRCP in 1924 and FRCS Ed in 1927. While studying surgery, he earned a living by giving dental anaesthetics and developed an interest in anaesthetics.

In 1936, the University of Oxford approached Lord Nuffield to consider endowing three chairs in medicine, surgery, and obstetrics and gynaecology. Nuffield, who had received an anaesthetic from Macintosh, agreed, but against the university's wishes, insisted on the addition of a chair in anaesthetics, to be held by Macintosh. They could not ignore the £2 million on offer and Macintosh took up his appointment in February 1937, the first professor of anaesthetics outside America.

In the Second World War, Macintosh held the rank of Air Commodore and trained anaesthetists for the armed services. His research included hazardous experiments to test life jackets (immersing Edgar Alexander Pask in a wave tank while anaesthetised), the provision of respirable atmospheres in submarines and survival during parachute descent from high altitudes.

Macintosh designed equipment that now bears his name: a laryngoscope, an anaesthetic vaporiser, spray and endobronchial tube. The laryngoscope he designed in 1941 remains the most-used today. It was developed from a Boyle-Davis mouth gag, used for tonsillectomy. Macintosh noted that this mouth gag indirectly elevated the epiglottis and exposed the laryngeal aperture.

Macintosh studied unexplained deaths that occurred under anaesthesia and established a training programme. He travelled widely, giving demonstrations of "safe and simple" anaesthesia.

Macintosh married Dorothy Manning, whose sister Mary, was married to Archie Forbes.

Honours
Macintosh was knighted in 1955, and received many honorary doctorates and fellowships.

See also
History of general anesthesia
History of tracheal intubation
Laryngoscopy
Tracheal intubation

References

External links

1897 births
1989 deaths
New Zealand medical researchers
New Zealand academics
Fellows of Pembroke College, Oxford
Statutory Professors of the University of Oxford
New Zealand anaesthetists
People from Timaru
People educated at Waitaki Boys' High School
20th-century New Zealand medical doctors